Illinois is divided into 17 congressional districts, each represented by a member of the United States House of Representatives. The majority of Illinois' districts are located in the Chicago area.

In the 2022 midterm elections, per the 2020 United States census, Illinois lost a congressional seat.

Current districts and representatives
List of members of the United States House delegation from Illinois, their terms, district maps, and the district political ratings according to the CPVI. 
The delegation in the 118th United States Congress has a total of 17 members, with 14 Democrats and 3 Republicans as of 2023.

Historical and present district boundaries
Table of United States congressional district boundary maps in the State of Illinois, presented chronologically. All redistricting events that took place in Illinois between 1973 and 2013 are shown.

Obsolete districts

See also

 United States congressional delegations from Illinois
 List of United States congressional districts

References

External links
"Explore U.S. House Candidates by Congressional District", interactive map, WTTW